Milda Vainiutė (born 1962) is a Lithuanian legal scholar and politician.

Biography 
She was a professor at Mykolas Romeris University and legal adviser of Valdas Adamkus, President of Lithuania. Vainiutė is an specialist in constitutional law. She graduated in law from Vilnius University.

From December, 2016 to March, 2018 Milda Vainiutė was Minister of Justice of Lithuania in Skvernelis Cabinet.

References 

Ministers of Justice of Lithuania
1962 births
Living people
Vilnius University alumni
Academic staff of Mykolas Romeris University
Lithuanian scholars of constitutional law
Women government ministers of Lithuania
21st-century Lithuanian politicians
Female justice ministers
Women legal scholars

21st-century Lithuanian women politicians